Jens Kristian Malmsjö, born Mattsson (born 19 November 1975) is a Swedish Olympic sailor. He finished 14th in the Tornado event at the 2004 Summer Olympics together with Martin Strandberg.

References

Swedish male sailors (sport)
Olympic sailors of Sweden
Tornado class sailors
Malmö Segelsällskap sailors
Sailors at the 2004 Summer Olympics – Tornado
1975 births
Living people